Galileo Chanes (28 March 1917 – 3 April 1961) was a Uruguayan footballer who played for Peñarol and Club Atlético Huracán, as well as the Uruguay national football team. He represented Uruguay at the 1937 South American Championship.

References

External links
 

1917 births
1961 deaths
Uruguayan footballers
Uruguayan expatriate footballers
Uruguay international footballers
Association football midfielders
Peñarol players
Club Atlético River Plate (Montevideo) players
Club Atlético Huracán footballers
Argentine Primera División players
Uruguayan Primera División players
Footballers from Montevideo
Expatriate footballers in Argentina
Uruguayan expatriate sportspeople in Argentina